Djordje Aleksandar Mihailovic (born November 10, 1998) is an American professional soccer player who plays as an attacking midfielder or winger for Eredivisie club AZ Alkmaar and the United States national team.

Personal life
As the son of former Washington Diplomats midfielder Aleksandar "Alex" Mihailović, Djordje was introduced to soccer at an early age. His sister, Aleksandra, played soccer at the University of New Mexico. He is of  Serbian descent.

Club career

Early career 
Mihailovic grew up playing for his father's club, Chicago Blast. He joined the Chicago Fire youth academy in the fall of 2013, starting with the under 16s, and moving up to the under 18s the following year. Mihailovic totaled 41 goals in 66 matches during his tenure with the academy.

Chicago Fire 
The Chicago Fire signed Mihailovic as a homegrown player on January 27, 2017. The 18-year-old became the ninth Homegrown signing in Fire history and the first player born after the club's founding in 1997. He made his MLS debut on March 11, 2017 in a 2–0 home victory over Real Salt Lake. He was subbed on for Michael de Leeuw in the 93rd minute. He scored his first MLS goal on September 27, 2017 in a 4–1 away victory over the San Jose Earthquakes. His goal, assisted by Matt Polster, came in the 14th minute and was the first of the match. During the Knockout Round clash with the New York Red Bulls, Mihailovic was diagnosed with a ruptured ACL after a tackle that left him in serious pain. Mihailovic would miss 6–8 months before returning to the field.

CF Montréal
On December 17, 2020, Mihailovic was traded to CF Montréal in exchange for $400,000 in 2021 General Allocation Money, $400,000 in 2022 General Allocation Money, as well as $200,000 in conditional General Allocation Money. Mihailovic also signed a new three-year deal with Montreal. In 2021, he had 16 assists, establishing a new CF Montréal club record.

AZ
On August 24, 2022 Montreal announced a transfer had been agreed with Eredivisie side AZ for Mihailovic, effective January 1, 2023. He made his debut on January 7 against Vitesse.

International career 
As a U.S. Youth International who spent time in the U-17 Residency Program in Bradenton, Florida, Mihailovic scored three goals for the U-19s in 2016 including the game winners against Mauritania in the 2016 COTIF Tournament in Valencia, Spain on July 28 and against Hungary in the Stevan-Vilotic Cele Tournament in Topola, Serbia on September 5.

Mihailovic made his senior team debut on January 27, 2019 against Panama, where he scored his first senior international goal.
Mihailovic was included on the 23 man roster for the 2019 CONCACAF Gold Cup where he made two appearances during the group stage.

Career statistics

Club

International

Scores and results list United States' goal tally first, score column indicates score after each Mihailovic goal.

Honors
CF Montreal
Canadian Championship: 2021

References

External links 

 

 

1998 births
Living people
American people of Serbian descent
American soccer players
Association football midfielders
Chicago Fire FC players
Homegrown Players (MLS)
Major League Soccer players
People from Lemont, Illinois
Soccer players from Jacksonville, Florida
Soccer players from Illinois
Sportspeople from DuPage County, Illinois
United States men's youth international soccer players
United States men's international soccer players
United States men's under-23 international soccer players
2019 CONCACAF Gold Cup players
CF Montréal players
AZ Alkmaar players
Eredivisie players
American expatriate soccer players
Expatriate footballers in the Netherlands
American expatriate sportspeople in the Netherlands
American people of Macedonian descent
Designated Players (MLS)